Neethone Vuntanu is a 2002 Indian Telugu-language romantic drama film directed by T. Prabhakar and starring Upendra, Rachana, and Sanghavi in the lead roles. The film's title is based on a song from Zamindar (1965).

Cast 
 Upendra as Ravi
 Rachana as Aparna/Subbalakshmi
 Sanghavi as Divya
 Thriller Manju
 Sudhakar
 Tanikella Bharani
 Subbaraya Sharma
 Siva Parvathi

Soundtrack  
The songs were composed by Vandemataram Srinivas.

Release 
Gudipoodi Srihari of The Hindu wrote that "The film is interesting as long as the hide and seeks game goes on". Jeevi of Idlebrain gave the film a rating of two and a half out of five and wrote that " The story of the film is novel. But bad screenplay and direction misuses the novel storyline".

References 

2000s Telugu-language films
2002 romantic comedy-drama films
2002 films
Indian romantic comedy-drama films
2002 comedy films
2002 drama films